Okeechobee station is a train station in Okeechobee, Florida, served by Amtrak.

Background 
The previous depot at the site was built in 1924 for the Seaboard Air Line Railway, and was demolished in 2014. Amtrak currently uses an adjacent shelter constructed in 2011. Built of red brick-accented with cream-colored, rock-faced stonework, the shelter has a waiting room with large windows. The $1.5 million project was funded through Amtrak's "Mobility First" initiative under the American Recovery and Reinvestment Act of 2009.

References

External links

Okeechobee Amtrak Station (USA Rail Guide -- Train Web)
Photos of 2011 station, at FCRP site

Amtrak stations in Florida
Transportation buildings and structures in Okeechobee County, Florida
Railway stations in the United States opened in 1924
Seaboard Air Line Railroad stations
1924 establishments in Florida